Rubén Darío Acosta Ospina (born 20 August 1996) is a Colombian cyclist, who currently rides for UCI Continental team .

References

External links

1996 births
Living people
Colombian male cyclists
21st-century Colombian people